Qeshlaq-e Posht Qala (also Romanized as Qeshlāq-e Posht Qalā) is a village in Itivand-e Jonubi Rural District, Kakavand District, Delfan County, Lorestan Province, Iran. At the 2006 census, its population was 22, in 4 families.

References 

Towns and villages in Delfan County